35th BSFC Awards
December 7, 2014

Best Film: 
Boyhood
The 35th Boston Society of Film Critics Awards, honoring the best in filmmaking in 2014, were given on December 7, 2014.

Winners

Best Film:
Boyhood
Runner-up: Birdman
Best Actor:
Michael Keaton – Birdman
Runner-up: Timothy Spall – Mr. Turner
Best Actress:
Marion Cotillard – Two Days, One Night and The Immigrant
Runner-up: Hilary Swank – The Homesman
Best Supporting Actor:
J. K. Simmons – Whiplash
Runners-up: Edward Norton – Birdman
Best Supporting Actress:
Emma Stone – Birdman
Runner-up: Laura Dern – Wild
Best Director:
Richard Linklater – Boyhood
Runner-up: Clint Eastwood – American Sniper
Best Screenplay:
Alejandro G. Iñárritu – Birdman (TIE)
Richard Linklater – Boyhood (TIE)
Runner-up: Mike Leigh – Mr. Turner
Best Cinematography:
Emmanuel Lubezki – Birdman
Runner-up: Dick Pope – Mr. Turner
Best Foreign Language Film:
Two Days, One Night
Runner-up: Ida
Best Documentary:
Citizenfour
Runner-up: Jodorowsky's Dune
Best Animated Film:
The Tale of the Princess Kaguya
Runner-up: The Lego Movie
Best Editing:
Sandra Adair – Boyhood
Runner-up: Joel Cox and Gary Roach – American Sniper
Best New Filmmaker:
Dan Gilroy – Nightcrawler
Runner-up: Gillian Robespierre – Obvious Child
Best Ensemble Cast:
Boyhood
Runner-up: Birdman
Best Use of Music in a Film:
Inherent Vice
Runner-up: Whiplash

External links
 2014 Winners

References

2014
2014 film awards
2014 awards in the United States
2014 in Boston
December 2014 events in the United States